Wildeyes (stylized as WILDEYES) is an American band made of trio Emily Kohavi, Daniel Kohavi and Max Hoffman.

Overview
Wildeyes is an American folk band from Nashville, Tennessee. The band members Emily Kohavi, Daniel Kohavi and Max Hoffman were neighbors, who started playing music together for fun. They first started working together professionally on sync licensing under the band name Scriptkiddie and later changed their name to Wildeyes. The band has played at Firefly Music Festival, and performed as a part of NPR Music’s Tiny Desk On The Road. Their music is influenced by a variety of musical genres including Folk, Country, and Rock.

Discography

References 

Musical groups from Nashville, Tennessee